Yamil Saba Fuentes (born 21 September 1975) is a Venezuelan windsurfer. He competed in the men's Mistral One Design event at the 2000 Summer Olympics.

References

External links
 

1975 births
Living people
Venezuelan male sailors (sport)
Venezuelan windsurfers
Olympic sailors of Venezuela
Sailors at the 2000 Summer Olympics – Mistral One Design
Lightning class sailors
Nacra 17 class sailors
Sportspeople from Caracas
Pan American Games medalists in sailing
Pan American Games silver medalists for Venezuela
Medalists at the 2007 Pan American Games
Sailors at the 2007 Pan American Games
Sailors at the 2011 Pan American Games
Sailors at the 2015 Pan American Games
Sailors at the 2019 Pan American Games
Central American and Caribbean Games silver medalists for Venezuela
Central American and Caribbean Games medalists in sailing
Competitors at the 2014 Central American and Caribbean Games
Competitors at the 2018 Central American and Caribbean Games